Robert G. Thibault,  (born September 29, 1959) is a Canadian politician.

Early life
Thibault was born in Digby, Nova Scotia in 1959. He is the grandson of former provincial politician, Joseph William Comeau.

Political career
Thibault served as a municipal councillor in Clare, Nova Scotia from 1988 to 2001 and was reelected in 2012. He is a member of the Liberal Party of Canada and a former member in the House of Commons of Canada, serving three terms as the representative of West Nova from 2000 to 2008. He won his first federal election in 2000. He was named  Minister of State (Atlantic Canada Opportunities Agency) in 2001. He was Minister of Fisheries and Oceans from 2002 to 2003. He won re-election in 2004. Thibault was the Parliamentary Secretary to the Minister of Health from 2004 to 2006 under Paul Martin. In the 2006 election, he defeated Conservative opponent and former Nova Scotia cabinet minister Greg Kerr by 511 votes. On April 27, 2007, Thibault was named Liberal Critic for Competitiveness and the New Economy by Liberal leader Stéphane Dion. He was subsequently appointed Liberal critic for Health. Thibault was defeated in Canada's 40th general election on October 14, 2008, by Conservative opponent Greg Kerr.

On October 3, 2009, Thibault was once again nominated to contest the West Nova seat for the Liberals in the 2011 federal election. On May 2, 2011, Thibault was defeated in his comeback attempt, losing to Kerr by more than 4,000 votes.

Controversy
In August 2008, Thibault caused controversy with some accusing him of ageism when he suggested that his Conservative opponent Greg Kerr was too old for the job. Only five days later, Thibault was accused of sexism when he called Marjory LeBreton, then government leader in the Senate, an "idiot" and suggested she should "go back to making tea" for former prime minister Brian Mulroney. Three months later, Thibault lost his seat in the 2008 election.

Electoral record

References

External links
 

1959 births
Living people
Members of the 26th Canadian Ministry
Members of the House of Commons of Canada from Nova Scotia
Liberal Party of Canada MPs
Members of the King's Privy Council for Canada
People from Digby County, Nova Scotia
Acadian people